Running Crane Lake is located in Glacier National Park, in the U. S. state of Montana. Red Mountain is south of the lake, while Eagle Plume Mountain is to the north.

See also
List of lakes in Glacier County, Montana

References

Lakes of Glacier National Park (U.S.)
Lakes of Glacier County, Montana